The Westrail DB class is a class of diesel-electric locomotives built by Clyde Engineering, Rosewater, for Westrail in 1982-1983.

History

In 1980, Westrail ordered ten DB class locomotives from Clyde Engineering, Rosewater. Designated as the EMD G26C-2, they were an evolution of the DA class. The original order was extended to thirteen in October 1980. The class were fitted with a full width cab, dual braking (air and vacuum) systems, a pressurised body to exclude dust and were the first Westrail locomotives to have air-conditioned cabs.

They were not owned by Westrail, but leverage leased from LVL Nominees, entering service between April 1982 and May 1983. All were named after cities and shires in South West Western Australia. Brass nameplates were originally fitted, but these were later replaced by painted names.

All were included in the sale of Westrail to Australian Railroad Group in December 2000, the State Government having bought out the leases shortly before. As part of  a policy to drop letter classifications in favour of a numeric system based on horsepower, they became the 2300 class. In May 2003, 2313 was transferred to Australian Southern Railroad's Whyalla operation, it returned in August 2006.

In June 2006, all were included in the sale of Australian Railroad Group's Western Australian operation to QR National. Between 2006 and 2012, all were equipped with ZTR engine control equipment. A change in policy saw letter classifications reintroduced, with the class again becoming the DB class. Upon being fitted with ZTR equipment, they were reclassified as DBZs.

All remained in service at the beginning of 2013, however 12 months later this was down to five with the last two withdrawn in March 2014. By June 2014, seven had returned to service.

Class list

References

External links

Flickr gallery
History of Western Australian Railways & Stations gallery

Aurizon diesel locomotives
Clyde Engineering locomotives
Co-Co locomotives
Diesel locomotives of Western Australia
Railway locomotives introduced in 1982
3 ft 6 in gauge locomotives of Australia
Diesel-electric locomotives of Australia